Josip Srebrnič, also spelled Srebrnić, (2 February 1876 – 21 June 1966) was a Slovene Roman Catholic prelate who spent most of his career in Croatia.

Born in a Slovene-speaking family in Solkan, Austria-Hungary (Solkan is now part of Nova Gorica, Slovenia), he was consecrated priest in 1906. In 1923, he became Bishop of Krk in Croatia, then part of the Kingdom of Serbs, Croats and Slovenes. He served as bishop on the island of Krk for almost forty year, until 1961. During this long period, he publicly defended the freedom of the Roman Catholic Church against different authorities. He opposed the unificatory tendencies of the dictatorship of king Alexander I of Yugoslavia; in 1932, he published the booklet Crkvi slobodu! (Freedom to the Church!), in which he denounced the educational and cultural policies of Alexander's royal dictatorship. Between 1941 and 1943, he voiced his opposition to the chauvinist anti-Croatian policies of the Italian Fascist forces, and organized humanitarian help for the prisoners in the Italian Rab concentration camp, which was established on the territory under his ecclesiastical jurisdiction. He continued to publicly defend the personal and human rights of his flock during the Nazi German occupation regime (1943–1945). In 1943 he refused to join the Partisans of the National Liberation Movement in Croatia or even to provide chaplains for Roman Catholic Partisans. After 1945, he was critical of the Yugoslav Communist regime.

Srebrnič died in Krk, and was buried in the Krk Cathedral.

References 
Brief biographical data (in Slovene)
Homepage of the Diocese of Krk (in Croatian)

External links 
Review of a book about Srebrnić (in Croatian)

Slovenian Roman Catholic archbishops
People from the City Municipality of Nova Gorica
Croatian people of Slovenian descent
1966 deaths
1876 births